The 33rd Street Railroad Bridge is a truss bridge that carries the Allegheny Valley Railroad on the P&W Subdivision over the Allegheny River that connects downtown Pittsburgh, Pennsylvania to Herrs Island, Pittsburgh, United States.

History
The Allegheny River was first crossed at this point by a railroad bridge built in 1884 by the Iron City Bridge Works, which moved to Pittsburgh from Cincinnati in 1856.

This was replaced by the B&O bridge in 1921.

See also 
List of crossings of the Allegheny River

References 

Railroad bridges in Pennsylvania
Bridges in Pittsburgh
Bridges over the Allegheny River
Former CSX Transportation bridges
Baltimore and Ohio Railroad bridges
Bridges completed in 1921
1921 establishments in Pennsylvania
Steel bridges in the United States